State Road 190 (NM 190) is a  state highway in the US state of New Mexico. NM 190's western terminus is at NM 2 in Dexter, and the eastern terminus is at County Route 1 (CR 1) route west of Dexter.

Major intersections

See also

References

190
Transportation in Chaves County, New Mexico